Luca Fumagalli (born Inzago, May 29, 1837 - died Milan, June 5, 1908) was an Italian composer, pianist, and music educator.

Fumagalli studied at the Milan Conservatory before traveling to Paris in 1860.  He taught piano at the Philadelphia Conservatory and, later, in Milan.  His opera Luigi XI was premiered at the Teatro della Pergola in Florence in 1875; he also composed a symphony titled Sinfonia Marinaresca and a number of virtuosic piano works.

Fumagalli's brothers Carlo, Disma, Adolfo, and Polibio were all composers as well.

References
 Alfred Baumgartner: Propyläen Welt der Musik, Band 2, p. 360

Further reading

1837 births
1908 deaths
19th-century Italian musicians
19th-century classical pianists
19th-century Italian male musicians
Italian composers
Italian male composers
Italian classical pianists
Italian male pianists
Male classical pianists
Milan Conservatory alumni
Academic staff of Milan Conservatory
University of the Arts (Philadelphia) faculty
People from the Province of Milan